Paenibacillus is a genus of facultative anaerobic, endospore-forming bacteria, originally included within the genus Bacillus and then reclassified as a separate genus in 1993. Bacteria belonging to this genus have been detected in a variety of environments, such as: soil, water, rhizosphere, vegetable matter, forage and insect larvae, as well as clinical samples. The name reflects: Latin paene means almost, so the paenibacilli are literally "almost bacilli". The genus includes P. larvae, which causes American foulbrood in honeybees, P. polymyxa, which is capable of fixing nitrogen, so is used in agriculture and horticulture, the Paenibacillus sp. JDR-2 which is a rich source of chemical agents for biotechnology applications, and pattern-forming strains such as P. vortex and P. dendritiformis discovered in the early 90s, which develop complex colonies with intricate architectures as shown in the pictures:

Importance
Interest in Paenibacillus spp. has been rapidly growing since many were shown to be important for agriculture and horticulture (e.g. P. polymyxa), industrial (e.g. P. amylolyticus), and medical applications (e.g. P. peoriate). These bacteria produce various extracellular enzymes such as polysaccharide-degrading enzymes and proteases, which can catalyze a wide variety of synthetic reactions in fields ranging from cosmetics to biofuel production. Various Paenibacillus spp. also produce antimicrobial substances that affect a wide spectrum of micro-organisms such as fungi, soil bacteria, plant pathogenic bacteria, and even important anaerobic pathogens such as Clostridium botulinum.

More specifically, several Paenibacillus species serve as efficient plant growth-promoting rhizobacteria (PGPR), which competitively colonize plant roots and can simultaneously act as biofertilizers and as antagonists (biopesticides) of recognized root pathogens, such as bacteria, fungi, and nematodes. They enhance plant growth by several direct and indirect mechanisms. Direct mechanisms include phosphate solubilization, nitrogen fixation, degradation of environmental pollutants, and hormone production. Indirect mechanisms include controlling phytopathogens by competing for resources such as iron, amino acids and sugars, as well as by producing antibiotics or lytic enzymes. Competition for iron also serves as a strong selective force determining the microbial population in the rhizosphere. Several studies show that PGPR exert their plant growth-promoting activity by depriving native microflora of iron. Although iron is abundant in nature, the extremely low solubility of Fe at pH 7 means that most organisms face the problem of obtaining enough iron from their environments. To fulfill their requirements for iron, bacteria have developed several strategies, including the reduction of ferric to ferrous ions, the secretion of high-affinity iron-chelating compounds, called siderophores, and the uptake of heterologous siderophores. P. vortex's genome, for example, harbors many genes which are employed in these strategies, in particular it has the potential to produce siderophores under iron-limiting conditions.

Despite the increasing interest in Paenibacillus spp., genomic information of these bacteria is lacking. More extensive genome sequencing could provide fundamental insights into pathways involved in complex social behavior of bacteria, and can discover a source of genes with biotechnological potential.

Candidatus Paenibacillus glabratella causes white nodules and high mortality of Biomphalaria glabrata freshwater snails. This is potentially important because Biomphalaria glabrata is an intermediate host of schistosomiasis.

Pattern formation, self-organization, and social behaviors

Several Paenibacillus species can form complex patterns on semisolid surfaces. Development of such complex colonies require self-organization and cooperative behavior of individual cells while employing sophisticated chemical communication called quorum sensing. Pattern formation and self-organization in microbial systems is an intriguing phenomenon and reflects social behaviors of bacteria that might provide insights into the evolutionary development of the collective action of cells in higher organisms.

Pattern forming in P. vortex
One of the most fascinating pattern forming Paenibacillus species is P. vortex, self-lubricating, flagella-driven bacteria. P. vortex organizes its colonies by generating modules, each consisting of many bacteria, which are used as building blocks for the colony as a whole. The modules are groups of bacteria that move around a common center at about 10 µm/s.

Pattern forming in P. dendritiformis
An additional intriguing pattern forming Paenibacillus species is P. dendritiformis, which generates two different morphotypes – the branching (or tip-splitting) morphotype and the chiral morphotype that is marked by curly branches with well-defined handedness (see pictures).

These two pattern-forming Paenibacillus strains exhibit many distinct physiological and genetic traits, including β-galactosidase-like activity causing colonies to turn blue on X-gal plates and multiple drug resistance (MDR) (including septrin, penicillin, kanamycin, chloramphenicol, ampicillin, tetracycline, spectinomycin, streptomycin, and mitomycin C). Colonies that are grown on surfaces in Petri dishes exhibit several-fold higher drug resistance in comparison to growth in liquid media. This particular resistance is believed to be due to a surfactant-like liquid front that actually forms a particular pattern on the Petri plate.

References

External links
Paenibacillus Taxonomy
Genome sequence of the pattern forming Paenibacillus vortex bacterium reveals potential for thriving in complex environments - manuscript
Prof. Eshel Ben-Jacob home page
Specific PCR for Paenibacillus genus based on rpoB gene
Use of rpoB gene analysis for identification of nitrogen-fixing Paenibacillus species as an alternative to the 16S rRNA gene
Paenibacillus at BacDive - the Bacterial Diversity Metadatabase

Paenibacillaceae
Bacteria genera